Nijer Shonge Nijer Jiboner Modhu is a Bengali novel written by Bangladeshi author Humayun Azad. It was first published in February 2000 in Ekushey Book Fair by Agamee Prakashani. The novel deals with rural life of Bikrampur of 1950s decade and believed to be inspired by author's own childhood life as Azad was also born and brought up in Bikrampur which is now known as Munshiganj District, however the fictitious character Jalkador, who is the main protagonist of the novel, is an illiterate boy.

The main subject of the novel is about growing-up of a boy named Jalkador in Rarhikhal village of Bikrampur (the village is now in Sreenagar Upazila of Munshiganj District) in 1950s decade when Bangladesh was part of Pakistan. The novel tells the story of his journey as a rural Bengali boy from boyhood to adolescence. The story begins when he is ten years old and ends when he is fifteen.

Author Humayun Azad dedicated this novel to his childhood rural friends and compared the novel to Bibhutibhushan Bandyopadhyay's novel Pather Panchali.

Story theme
Jalkador lives in Rarhikhal village with his parents and siblings; he has one brother and one sister who are named Abju and Moyna respectively. Though his family is well-off in the village, Jalkador comes from a farming background; his father is a farmer and he is a cowboy who raises cattle who does not go to school and speaks local dialect of the Bengali language. He grows up gradually but his penis remains uncircumcised, circumcision is compulsory according to the village rituals.
When monsoon comes, Jalkador sees flood, their whole village is affected by the flood, flood also attacks their house. As Jalkador’s family is well off, flood-affect recovery is easily done in their house.

Jalkador watches canoe sprint and kabaddi game in village. His friend Majid teaches him to smoke cigarette and they talk about when to get circumcised, they see each other’s penis secretly. From Majid, Jalkador learns basic knowledge about sexuality.

In the last part of the novel, Jalkador learns to masturbate, before it, he faces nocturnal emission; he is already a teen-ager during this time. He gets sexually aroused seeing female snake-charmers.

Setting
This novel was set in the 1950s decade’s Bengali rural life of East Pakistan. At that time East Pakistani villages had no electricity, nor had any advantage of good sanitation, however well-off families of Bengali villages sent their children to schools but Jalkador and his siblings don’t go to school nor Jalkador’s parents have literacy.

Characters
Jalkador - The main protagonist of the novel, a young Bengali rural boy
Abju and Moyna - Jalkador's siblings, junior to Jalkador
Majid - Jalkador's friend
Rokman - Jalkador's family's servant

References

External links
Nijer Shonge Nijer Jiboner Modhu at amazon.com
Nijer Shonge Nijer Jiboner Modhu at WorldCat

Books by Humayun Azad
Novels by Humayun Azad
Bengali-language literature
Bengali-language novels
Bangladeshi novels
Bangladeshi books
2000 novels
Juvenile sexuality in books
Novels set in the 1950s
Novels set in Bengal